Bulldog Courage is a 1935 American Western film directed by Sam Newfield, and produced by Sigmund Neufeld for Puritan Pictures.

Plot
When the rich and powerful Mr. Williams seizes Slim Braddock's mine through the courts, Pete is unable to afford a legal defence or appeal. He takes matters into his own hands by robbing the proceeds of his mine from Williams until he is fatally shot by a sheriff's posse but his last words are that Williams will have another Braddock to contend with.

Slim's son Tim rides into town to also take the law into his own hands to help the impoverished locals in keeping their lucrative mines.

Cast
Tim McCoy as Slim Braddock / Tim Braddock
Joan Woodbury as Helen Brennan
Paul Fix as Bailey
Eddie Buzard as Tim as a boy
John Cowell as Pete Brennan
Karl Hackett as Williams
John Elliott as Judge Charley Miller
Edmund Cobb as Cal Jepson
Edward Hearn as Henchman Clayton
Jack Rockwell as Sheriff Pendleton

External links

1935 films
1935 Western (genre) films
1930s English-language films
American black-and-white films
Films directed by Sam Newfield
American Western (genre) films
1930s American films